Woman with a Raven at an Abyss (or Woman with a Raven on a Precipice; German: Die Frau mit dem Raben am Abgrund) is a c. 1803/04 print by the German Romantic painter Caspar David Friedrich, made into a woodcut by his brother Christian Friedrich, a carpenter and furniture maker, around the same time.

The images evokes themes of loss, abandonment, loneliness, the shortness of life, and death. To achieve this effect, Fredrick employs nightmarish imagery, including a gothic wood of barren trees whose branches appear as if the arms of the dead, a single vulturous raven, drawn in an almost childlike manner that recalls fairy tale illustrations.

Background

It is one of four of Fredricks' drawings his brother cut as blocks, with this work, although darker often seen as a companion piece to the 1803 drawing/woodcut of approximately the same size, The Woman with the Spider's Web.

Like that work, the image may have been influenced by Ludwig Tieck's stories, particularly his 1797 fairy tale "Der blonde Eckbert", which contains passages where Eckbert's wife, Bertha, is abandoned by her husband and becomes stranded on an isolated mountain top, while she yearningly reflects on moments from their her youth.

Description

The figure is older than the woman in the "Spider's Web" drawing, and far more distressed. She stands at the edge of a chasm, turned towards the viewer with her left arm reaching out. Behind her is a fir tree, while a large raven, representing death or hopelessness, is perched on the arms of the dead tree besides her.

Around her are symbols of both the transience of life and death, and other physical objects that hint at physical and emotional isolation, including fallen trees, ravens and a winding snake. Describing the image, the 20th century art historian Albert Boime writes that the image presents "a wild, disheveled woman at the edge of a precipitous cliff, grasping a branch like an oar, while a raven claws and a serpent slithers around the other end of her stick."

Friedrich later depicted ominous ravens in his c. 1822 painting, The Tree of Crows, where the birds are shown flying before a twisted oak tree and neolithic burial ground.

References

Sources

Bartrum, Giulia; Koerner, Joseph Leo; Kuhlemann, Ute. Albrecht Dürer and His Legacy: The Graphic Work of a Renaissance Artist. British Museum, 2002.  
 Börsch-Supan, Helmut et al. Baltic Light: Early Open-Air Painting in Denmark and North Germany, Yale University Press, 2000. 
Boime, Albert. A Social History of Modern Art: Art in an Age of Bonapartism, 1800-15. Volume 2. Chicago: University of Chicago Press, 1990. 
Drawings and Prints: Selections from the Permanent Collection. New York: Metropolitan Museum of Art, 2004
Makholm, Kristin. Nineteenth–Century German Prints and Drawings from the Milwaukee Art Museum. Milwaukee: Milwaukee Art Museum, 2002
Rewald, Sabine (ed). The Romantic Vision of Caspar David Friedrich: Paintings and Drawings from the U.S.S.R.. New York: Metropolitan Museum of Art, 1990
Wolf, Norbert. Caspar David Friedrich: 1774-1840: The Painter of Stillness. Köln: Taschen, 2013. 

1803 in art
Paintings by Caspar David Friedrich
Works about melancholia
Birds in art